Varsity was a student-focused pub chain operating in the United Kingdom. The name originates from annual university sports competitions. It entered administration in 2013.  Coventry is the only remaining pub bearing the name Varsity which is now operated by Stonegate Pub Company.

History
The chain began in the mid-1990s. Its main competitor was Scream Pubs. Varsity was more sports-orientated than It's A Scream.

Varsity Wolverhampton – the first varsity bar in the chain – shut its doors in June 2012 after The University of Wolverhampton made a successful bid to the struggling Barracuda Group to purchase the building. It ceased trading in 2013.

Ownership

Wolverhampton and Dudley
Varsity was founded by Wolverhampton & Dudley.

Barracuda Group 
The Barracuda Group was formed in July 2000 by PPM Ventures, a private equity company that became Silverfleet Capital.

In September 2001 Barracuda Group bought fifty pubs from Wolverhampton & Dudley for £37.25 million, which included the 22 pubs of the Varsity chain.

In June 2005, the Barracuda Group was sold for £262 million to Charterhouse Capital Partners. In August 2006 there were 36 Varsity bars.

In October 2012, Barracuda was renamed The Bramwell Pub Company.

The Stonegate Pub Company
In October 2013, The Bramwell Pub Company went into administration. The Stonegate Pub Company bought 78 of the company's pubs including the Varsities in Lincoln and Coventry.

Operation
It operated the V Card, one of the first loyalty cards, which allowed a cheaper price for some drinks, and allows better offers on some of the food deals.

Previous Estate

North West England
 Longsight, Manchester, near the Elizabeth Gaskell campus of Manchester Metropolitan University

 Bolton, Churchgate
Church Street, Preston

North East England
 Sunderland, near the University of Sunderland, off the A1231

Yorkshire and the Humber
 Huddersfield
 Hull
 Leeds
 Sheffield, on West Street, on the Sheffield Supertram near the University of Sheffield (science and engineering departments)

East Midlands
 Leicester – two, on Friar Lane in the city centre, and London Road (A6) towards the University of Leicester
 Lincoln
 Loughborough

West Midlands
 Coventry, on Gibbet Hill Road, between the main University of Warwick campus and Westwood (Campus)
 Wolverhampton, at the University of Wolverhampton

South West England
 Gloucester

South East England
 Southampton – on London Road. Closed in 2016.
 Southampton – on Portswood Broadway. Closed in 2013.
 Southend-on-Sea

Wales
 Aberystwyth
 Bangor, near Bangor University
 Cardiff, near Cardiff University
 Roath (Cardiff), off the A469 next to the railway (Rhymney Line)
 Swansea

References

External links
 Stonegate Varsity

News items
 Punch up outside Swansea pub in January 2011

Companies based in Buckinghamshire
Pub chains
Stonegate Pub Company
Universities in the United Kingdom
Wycombe District